The ICC Men's Cricket World Cup Challenge League is a cricket competition contested in the List A format, and the bottom level of the three-league Cricket World Cup qualification system, which was introduced in 2019. Twelve teams participate in two groups, where the top team of each group advances to the World Cup Qualifier Play-off, which is a pathway to qualification for the next Cricket World Cup. The Challenge League replaced Divisions Three, Four and Five from the World Cricket League in determining World Cup qualification. The first edition was in 2019–2022.

Competition format

Competition

The Cricket World Cup is held once every four years and the Challenge League forms part of the qualification process for each edition. Twelve teams are divided into two groups of six and each group plays a triple round robin. The top ranked team of each group advances to the World Cup Qualifier Play-off. For a Challenge League team to qualify for the World Cup, they must, in succession, top their Challenge League group, achieve a top-two finish in the World Cup Qualifier Play-off and achieve a top-two finish in the World Cup Qualifier.

Promotion and relegation
A system of promotion and relegation exists between the Challenge League and ICC Cricket World Cup League 2. In the World Cup Qualifier Play-off, the bottom two teams from League 2 and the two champions of the Challenge League could change leagues depending on their results. Of the four teams, the two teams ranked higher will play in the next League 2, while the two teams ranked lower will play in the next Challenge League.

The bottom four teams from the Challenge League are also at risk of dropping out of the 32-team qualification system entirely. They play in the World Cup Challenge Play-off with four other teams from outside the system. Of the eight participants, only the top four teams will play in the next Challenge League.

Editions

References

External links
 Official website

Challenge League
Qualification for cricket competitions